Emilia Zdunek (born 12 September 1992) is a Polish footballer who plays as a midfielder for Polish Ekstraliga club Górnik Łęczna and the Poland women's national team.

References

External links 
 
 
 Official Twitter account 

1992 births
Living people
Women's association football midfielders
Polish women's footballers
Polish expatriate sportspeople in Spain
Expatriate women's footballers in Spain
Sportspeople from West Pomeranian Voivodeship
People from Stargard
Poland women's international footballers
RTP Unia Racibórz players
Górnik Łęczna (women) players
Sevilla FC (women) players